"Woke Up This Morning" is a song by British band Alabama 3 from their 1997 album Exile on Coldharbour Lane. The song is best known as the opening theme music for the American television series The Sopranos, which used a shortened version of the "Chosen One Mix" of the song.

Background and writing
Described as "a propulsive hip-hop song complete with Howlin' Wolf samples and a swelling gospel choir", the song has been cited as a paradigmatic example of a "great theme song", which "generates anticipation, immediately puts the viewer in a focused frame of mind, and creates the kind of sonic familiarity that breeds audience loyalty." Alabama 3 frontman Rob Spragg wrote the song after hearing about the 1996 Sara Thornton murder case, who stabbed her husband after claiming to be the victim two years of his abuse, mistreatment and neglect. The song is co-written with Piers Marsh, Simon Edwards, and Jake Black.

"We started with a Howlin' Wolf loop, but a lot of blues lyrics are quite misogynist," Spragg explained. "So I turned it round to be about a woman who's had enough and gets a gun – it's quite ironic that it's become a New Jersey gangster anthem."

Use in other media
In film
 The song is used in the film The House (2017).
 The remixed version that was used for The Sopranos plays over the end credits of the prequel film The Many Saints of Newark.

In music
 American rapper Nas sampled "Woke Up This Morning" for his 2001 song "Got Ur Self a Gun".
 The song is also interpolated in Beenie Man's 2002 single "Get Yourself a Gun", featuring Gringo.
 Jazz pianist Taylor Eigsti has a rendition of "Woke Up This Morning" on his album Lucky to Be Me.
 An instrumental version of the song was performed by The Brothas & Sistas on the album Woke Up This Morning.

In sports
 Arturo Gatti used the song for his ring entrance in his fight against Oscar De La Hoya.

In television
 A remixed version of "Woke Up This Morning" plays during the opening credits of the HBO television series The Sopranos. "Since it's been on The Sopranos," Spragg remarked, "we've met some nice men in Armani suits with fat hands and eaten some nice Italian food. But we're very happy to be associated with a programme of that calibre. While in no way endorsing the use of guns in any fetishistic manner, obviously." (On the Region 4 DVD release of season 1 of The Sopranos, the music video to "Woke Up This Morning" is included as a special feature. It is incorrectly credited as being performed by "Alabama 5".)
 Additionally, in The Sopranos season 1 episode "Boca", "Woke Up This Morning (Urban Takeover Mix)" can be heard in a tense scene as Tony Soprano ponders retaliation against his daughter's soccer coach for sexually abusing an underage player.
 A shortened alternate version of "Woke Up This Morning" can be heard for nearly 50 seconds in The Simpsons episode "Poppa's Got a Brand New Badge", while Fat Tony and his gang are on the ride to the Simpsons' house. The sequence is a parody of the opening sequence of The Sopranos. "Woke Up This Morning" is also heard in the later Simpsons episode "The Mook, the Chef, the Wife and Her Homer", which guest-starred Sopranos regulars Michael Imperioli and Joe Pantoliano.
 "Woke Up This Morning" was used in an episode of the BBC series Top Gear, in which the trio was driving through Florida in cheap, old American cars.
 "Woke Up This Morning" was used in the episode "Ghosts" (season 2, episode 8) of the Netflix series Lilyhammer, in which Frank Tagliano (Steven Van Zandt) and his Norwegian crew are driving through New York City.
 The song is parodied in the episode "The Dabba Don" of Harvey Birdman, Attorney at Law, which parodies various mob stereotypes, including The Sopranos, using The Flintstones.
 A snippet of the remix for The Sopranos’ theme song can be heard in episode 4 Marvel’s She-Hulk: Attorney at Law on Disney+ in jest and reference to the character Wong watching the show.

References

1997 songs
The Sopranos
One Little Indian Records singles
Trip hop songs
Songs inspired by deaths
Acid jazz songs
1997 singles
Alabama 3 songs